The 1973 All-Africa Games football tournament was the 2nd edition of the African Games men's football tournament for men. The football tournament was held in Lagos, Nigeria between 8–16 January 1973 as part of the 1973 All-Africa Games.

Qualified teams

The following teams qualified for the final tournament:

Squads

Group stage

Group 1

Group 2

Knockout phase

Semi-finals

Third place playoff

Final

Final ranking

External links
All-Africa Games 1973 - rsssf.com

1973
1973 All-Africa Games
All-Africa Games
All